Outrageous may refer to:

 Outrageous!, a 1977 Canadian comedy film
 Outrageous (Cher album), a 1989 remix album
 Outrageous (song), a 2004 single by Britney Spears
 Outrageous! (Alice in Videoland album)
 Outrageous (Kim Fowley album)
 "Outrageous", a song by Stephanie Mills from the 1984 album I've Got the Cure